Mansa Sylla (born 22 August 1983 in Guinea) is a Guinean footballer who is last known to have played for Uttar Baridhara SC of the Bangladesh Football Premier League in 2016.

Career

Sarawak FA

Brought in by Sarawak FA of the Malaysia Super League for the 2008 season, Sylla made intermittent appearances during his spell there due to constantly getting yellow and red cards. As a result, his contract was cancelled early by the club.

New Radiant

Joining of New Radiant of the Maldivian Dhivehi Premier League in January 2013, the Guinean defender put in a series of strong showings for the club in all competitions, including scoring the winner in the 2013 Maldives FA Cup Final. Eventually, he was released along with Ghanaian Yusif Aberdeen and Nigerian Kingsley.

References

External links 
 Mansa Sylla at playmakerstats.com (English version of ceroacero.es)

Expatriate footballers in Myanmar
Expatriate footballers in Malaysia
Guinean expatriates in Malaysia
Sarawak FA players
Expatriate footballers in the Maldives
Association football defenders
Guinean footballers
Myanmar National League players
Malaysia Super League players
Living people
1983 births
Expatriate footballers in Bangladesh
Uttar Baridhara SC players